Minister of Finance of Fiji is heading the ministry of Finance in Fiji.

Minister of finance in the Kingdom of Fiji

Financial secretaries in the Colony of Fiji

Ministers of Finance since 1967

See also
Economy of Fiji

External links
 Official Ministry website

References

Fiji
Fiji

Cabinet of Fiji
Politicians